Tom kha kai, tom kha gai, or Thai coconut soup is a spicy and sour hot soup with coconut milk in Thai cuisine.

Ingredients 
In Thailand, most tom kha kai recipes typically include coconut milk, galangal (sometimes substituted with ginger), kaffir lime leaves, lemongrass, Thai chili, coriander (or dill), straw mushrooms (or shiitake or other mushrooms), chicken, fish sauce, and lime juice. Fried chilies are sometimes added.

Variations 
In a Thai-style tom kha kai, dill weed is not used, whereas in a Lao-style tom kha kai, dill weed (phak si) is used. Dill weed is a common herb used in Lao cuisine. The Thais' answer to dill weed (known in Thailand as phak chi Lao, since it is known locally as a Lao herb) in Thai tom kha is coriander or cilantro (phak chi).

There are other versions of tom kha kai made with seafood (tom kha thale), mushrooms (tom kha het), pork (tom kha mu) and tofu (tom kha taohu).

In the late 19th century, tom kha was not a soup. It was a dish of chicken or duck simmered in a light coconut broth with a generous amount of galangal. It was served with a basic roasted chilli jam as a dipping relish.

Gallery

See also
 Tom yum
 Tom khlong
 List of soups

References

Further reading
 An Ancient Siamese Recipe for Tom Kha (1890 AD)
 Ayusuk, S., Siripongvutikorn, S., Thummaratwasik, P., & Usawakesmanee, W. (2009). "Effect of heat treatment on antioxidant properties of Tom-Kha paste and herbs/spices used in Tom-Kha paste". Kasetsart Journal Natural Science, 43(5), 305–312.
 Buasi, J. Joy's Thai Food Recipe Cookbook. Apornpradab Buasi.
 Sunanta, S. (October 2005). The globalization of Thai cuisine. In Canadian Council for Southeast Asian Studies Conference, York University, Toronto (pp. 1–17).

Thai soups
Chicken dishes
Foods containing coconut
Laotian soups